The Mayor of New Taipei is the chief political executive of the city of New Taipei in Taiwan. The mayor, a new position created when the predecessor entity of New Taipei, Taipei County, was elevated to a special municipality in 2010, is elected to a four-year term. The equivalent position in the former county was Taipei County Magistrate. The incumbent mayor is Hou Yu-ih of the Kuomintang since 25 December 2018.

Titles of the Mayor

List of mayors

Taipei County Magistrate

Mayor of New Taipei

Timeline

References

Notes

See also
 New Taipei

New Taipei